The first season of the animated television series Johnny Test premiered on Kids' WB on September 17, 2005 with the first episodes "Johnny to the Center of the Earth" and "Johnny X" and ended on July 29, 2006 with episodes "Johnny Dodgeball" and "Johnny & the Attack of the Monster Truck". This was the only season to be traditionally animated utilizing digital ink-and-paint, as the subsequent seasons are animated in Adobe Flash, in order to save the show's budget.

This season, along with season two, was released on DVD in a bundle on February 15, 2011 in Region 1. It was also released (without season two) on DVD on February 21, 2008 in Region 2.

Cast
 James Arnold Taylor as Johnny Test
 Louis Chirillo as Dukey
 Brittney Wilson as Mary Test
 Maryke Hendrikse as Susan Test

Episodes

2005 American television seasons
2006 American television seasons
Johnny Test seasons
2005 Canadian television seasons
2006 Canadian television seasons